Manchester Village Historic District may refer to:

Manchester Village Historic District (Manchester, Massachusetts), listed on the NRHP in Massachusetts
Manchester Village Historic District (Manchester, Vermont), listed on the NRHP in Vermont